Hoopla or Hupla may refer to:

 HOOPLA!, a periodical devoted to Object-Oriented Programming techniques
 Hoop-La (1933), starring Clara Bow 
 Houp La! (1916), a musical comedy
 Hoopla, an informal version of the ring-tossing game, Quoits
 The Hoopla, an Australian news and opinion website
 Hoopla!, former name of Malthouse Theatre, a Melbourne theatre company
 Hoopla (album), a 1999 album by the rapper Speech
 Hoopla (digital media service), a digital media service provided to public libraries
 Hoopla Software in Silicon Valley, San Jose, California
 Miles Hoopla, a cancelled Second World War bomber aircraft

See also
 Hupla language, a Papuan language
 Hoopa (disambiguation)